Beatrice Gumulya and Jessy Rompies were the defending champions but chose not to participate.

Twins Allura and Maribella Zamarripa won the title, defeating Polish duo Paula Kania-Choduń and Katarzyna Piter in the final, 6–3, 5–7, [11–9].

Seeds

Draw

Draw

References
Main Draw

Bellatorum Resources Pro Classic - Doubles